Stoke-upon-Trent, commonly called Stoke is one of the six towns that along with Hanley, Burslem, Fenton, Longton and Tunstall form the city of Stoke-on-Trent, in Staffordshire, England.

The town was incorporated as a municipal borough in 1874. In 1910 it became one of the six towns that federated to become the County Borough of Stoke-on-Trent and later the City of Stoke-on-Trent. Since federation in 1910 it has the seat of the city's council, though Stoke-on-Trent's city centre is usually regarded as being the nearby town of Hanley which, since federation, has been the most commercially important of the six towns.

Name
On 1 April 1910, the town was federated into the county borough of Stoke-on-Trent. By 1925 the area was granted city status.

Confusion can arise over the similarity of this town's name to that of the larger city. If the new borough had to be named after one of the original towns, the main reason for using "Stoke" is that this was where the new town's administration was sited, which in turn was because Stoke had the main transport links.

The river, canal, mainline railway, and trunk road passed through the centre of Stoke.  Stoke also had the main railway station (other towns were connected by the "loop" line) making the name of Stoke perhaps the most familiar outside the area. It made sense to name the city after the oldest and most commonly recognised name, even though it was not then the most significant town from a commercial perspective. (The commercial centre was Hanley, elevated and therefore relatively free, for most of the year, of the city's smog and smoke.)

Renaming proposals
Owing to the confusion between the town of Stoke and the larger city, there have been various calls, mainly amongst business leaders and academics, to rename either the town or the larger city. Proposals for the renamed town include Old Stoke, Stoke Minster and Stoke Town. There are also proposals to rename part of Hanley to Stoke-on-Trent City Centre.

Growth of Stoke and its transport links
Stoke was located where the upper reaches of the Trent meets the Fowlea Brook. The later Roman road through Stoke remained the basis for local road transport long after the Roman occupation.

The Anglian name given to this ancient place of meeting and worship was the 'stoc' (meeting place) on the Trent. It was the site of the first church in the area, built of wood around the year 670 by missionaries from Lindisfarne, later rebuilt in stone, and now known as Stoke Minster. A significant small town grew up around this church.

In the 18th century, the "Grand Trunk" canal came along the Trent valley to carry china clay from Cornwall cheaply to the Potteries (and pottery safely away). Many of the promoters of the canal were pottery magnates.

In the 19th century, the railways, too, came along the valley. The mainline Stoke-on-Trent railway station was opened by the North Staffordshire Railway (NSR) on 9 October 1848, replacing the temporary station sited at Whieldon Road which was constructed for the opening of the first NSR line on 17 April 1848. Travellers to the region would change trains at Stoke for local trains to their ticketed destination.

King's Hall

The assembly hall, ballroom, exhibition hall and theatre built in 1910–11 at the time of the federation to the design of T. Wallis and J. A. Bowater, and with an impressive 19-bay dressed stone frontage on Kingsway behind the town hall. It has proved itself to be a useful adjunct to the town hall of 1834–50. This was built on Glebe Street, opposite the parish church to the design of Henry Ward. The entire Town Hall–King's Hall complex serves the city of Stoke-on-Trent well as its chief administrative offices, including the lord mayor's parlour combined with all the facilities of the King's Hall for the city's formal entertainment.

Stoke Market
Stoke has held markets in various locations in the town since 1818. A market was set up within the newly built town hall in the 1830s, but this did not prove popular with the market traders of the time and in 1845 the market moved to Hide Street (the building can still be seen today).

In 1883 the market relocated to a larger purpose-built building fronting Church Street 'befitting its town status'. This Victorian market was all but destroyed by a fire that started on FA Cup final day (22 May 1982). Only the clock tower, entrance arch, fish section and shop frontage was saved. The current market in South Wolfe Street was opened in 1984. The former market site with its clock tower was block paved for use as an outdoor trading/event space, and a library and one-stop shop has also been added to the site.

The Potteries
In the 19th century, Stoke had a thriving pottery industry, hence its nickname, "The Potteries". Since the last half of the 20th century, however, almost all of the bottle-shaped kilns have been taken down, due to regulations from the Clean Air Act  – an estimated 4,000 bottle kilns in the heyday of the pottery industry, today reduced to a mere 46. Successful Stoke-upon-Trent potters include Spode, Copeland, Minton and Biltons.

Stoke today
Although Stoke is surpassed by its neighbouring town, Hanley in terms of size, population, and shops, it does have:
 Stoke Minster
 the same (abbreviated) name as the city
 the mainline railway station
 the main campus of Staffordshire University and its library (on the original site of the Staffordshire Cricket Club grounds) and the halls of residence (these latter are located on riverside land that was originally part of Hanley).
 a long-established purpose-built arthouse cinema, The Film Theatre.
 a purpose-built repertory theatre
 the Trent & Mersey canal and its National Cycle Network long-distance bicycle paths (NCN Route 5)
 the main complex of council offices and chamber – clustered in and around the town hall
 the EU-funded Stoke Approach area and the outdoor artworks
 The King's Hall music and events venue
 a free public lending library
 the outdoor and indoor markets
 The Spode Copeland pottery factory, disused since 2008 but in August 2010 at the start of a £25m regeneration programme.
 The Villas, the first conservation area in Stoke, containing several Grade II listed houses
 The Royal Stoke University Hospital and the City General Hospital, as well as the Central Outpatients Department, is nearby.  This is one, if not the, largest hospitals in the UK.
 Stoke has a thriving music scene, including such bands as Deviant UK and a dedicated band rehearsals room.

Outlying townships or districts within the bounds of Stoke-upon-Trent include Boothen, Hartshill, Mount Pleasant, Penkhull and Trent Vale.

References

Further reading
 
 

Areas of Stoke-on-Trent
Towns in Staffordshire
Former civil parishes in Staffordshire